The Half-Length Bather (French: La Baigneuse à mi-corps) is an 1807 painting by the French artist Jean-Auguste-Dominique Ingres. It is now in the Musée Bonnat in Bayonne.

It is one of his first female nudes. It is notable for the contrast between the realism in the depiction of the turban with the abstract treatment of the woman's back.

External links
Catalogue entry

Paintings by Jean-Auguste-Dominique Ingres
1807 paintings
Paintings in Bayonne
Nude art